Spitakashen or Aghkend is a village de facto in the Martuni Province of the breakaway Republic of Artsakh, de jure in the Khojavend District of Azerbaijan, in the disputed region of Nagorno-Karabakh. The village has an ethnic Armenian-majority population, and also had an Armenian majority in 1989.

Etymology 
The village's name means "white village" in both Armenian and Azerbaijani.

History 
During the Soviet period, the village was a part of the Martuni District of the Nagorno-Karabakh Autonomous Oblast.

Historical heritage sites 
Historical heritage sites in and around the village include the 13th-century Holy Savior Church and a 13th-century cemetery.

Economy and culture 
The population is mainly engaged in agriculture and animal husbandry. As of 2015, the village has a municipal building, a house of culture, a secondary school, and a medical centre.

Demographics 
The village had 437 inhabitants in 2005, and 453 inhabitants in 2015.

References

External links 
 
 

Populated places in Martuni Province
Populated places in Khojavend District